Revolutionary Socialist Party (Sreekandan Nair) was a splinter faction of Revolutionary Socialist Party. The leader of the party was N. Sreekantan Nair. The party was in alliance with Indian National Congress.

Defunct communist parties in India
 
Political parties with year of establishment missing